Prionosciadium linearifolium is a plant known from the Mexican states of Puebla and Zacatecas. It is a biennial herb with compound leaves with long linear leaflets.

References

Apioideae
Endemic flora of Mexico
Flora of Puebla
Flora of Zacatecas
Plants described in 1887
Taxa named by Sereno Watson
Taxa named by John Merle Coulter